Bahri, formerly known as the National Shipping Company of Saudi Arabia, is a transportation and logistics company, positioned as the national shipping carrier of Saudi Arabia.

Overview

The company structures its operations around five business units that include Oil, Chemicals, Logistics, Dry Bulk, and Ship Management. Bahri's service offering includes transportation of crude oil, oil products, chemical, bulk cargo, Roll-on/roll-off as well as ship management.

Today, Bahri is the largest owner and operator of Very Large Crude Carriers (VLCCs) in the world, and the largest owner of chemical tanker ships in the Middle East. The company currently owns 88 vessels, including 42 VLCCs, 35 chemical/product tankers, 6 multipurpose vessels and 5 dry bulk carriers.

History
The National Shipping Company of Saudi Arabia was created by a Royal Decree as a public company in 1978, with 22% ownership stake held by the Public Investment Fund (PIF) of the Saudi government, 20% by Saudi Aramco Development Company (SADCO), and the remaining shares listed on the Saudi stock exchange (Tadawul).

Business Units
Bahri Oil -
Bahri Oil was established in 1996 to serve the crude oil transportation needs of Saudi Arabia and other oil-producing countries in the region. Presently, Bahri Oil commercially manages a total of 42 VLCCs.

Bahri Chemicals -
Bahri Chemicals is the largest chemical/product tanker owner and operator in the Middle East. Established in 1990, Bahri Chemicals’ fleet consists of 35 chemical/product tankers with a fleet capacity of 1.3 million DWT.

Bahri Logistics -
Founded in 1979, Bahri Logistics was the first strategic business unit to be created within Bahri. Bringing a novel approach to its focus on optimal cargo mix, Bahri Logistics operates a total of 6 state-of-the-art multipurpose vessels on a regular liner schedule.

Bahri Dry Bulk -
Bahri Dry Bulk was set up in 2010 as a joint venture (JV) between Bahri and Arabian Agricultural Services Company (ARASCO), with a mandate to acquire, own, charter and commercially operate a fleet of dry bulk vessels. The JV paved the way for Bahri's diversification into dry bulk transportation, which represents about 23% of the total cargo imported to Saudi Arabia.

Bahri Ship Management -
Bahri Ship Management was established in the year 1996 jointly by Bahri and Acomarit, a ship management company based in Scotland, to provide ship management services to companies across the region. Based in Dubai, the company presently manages 88 ships comprising VLCCs, chemical carriers, dry bulk ships.

Bahri Roll-on/roll-off -
Cars, machineries and mafi roll trailers sea carriage and shipping division.

See also
 List of largest container shipping companies
 Nippon Yusen Kaisha
 American Roll-on Roll-off Carrier
 Toyofuji Shipping
 Messina Line

References

1978 establishments in Saudi Arabia
Shipping companies of Saudi Arabia
Government-owned companies of Saudi Arabia
Companies based in Riyadh
Conglomerate companies of Saudi Arabia
Transport companies established in 1978
Car carrier shipping companies
Ro-ro shipping companies
Container shipping companies